Adalberto Hilário Ferreira Neto or simply Adalberto (born 21 July 1987) is a Brazilian footballer.

Career
In March 2007, Adalberto transferred from América-MG to Westerlo, where he played 4 league matches in the Belgian First Division before returning to Brazil. He contract was terminated in June 2008. He played the 2009/2010 for  Kallo and was in April 2010 sold to Tupi Football Club. The central defender left after three months his club Tupi and returned to Belgium who signed with RFC Liège.

References

External links 
 
 
 Adalberto at ZeroZero

1987 births
Living people
Brazilian footballers
Brazilian expatriate footballers
Clube Atlético Mineiro players
Tupi Football Club players
K.V.C. Westerlo players
Ipatinga Futebol Clube players
RFC Liège players
Tombense Futebol Clube players
Americano Futebol Clube players
Guarani Esporte Clube (MG) players
Clube Atlético Linense players
Clube de Regatas Brasil players
Botafogo Futebol Clube (PB) players
Goytacaz Futebol Clube players
América Futebol Clube (RN) players
Esporte Clube São Bento players
Belgian Pro League players
Campeonato Brasileiro Série D players
Campeonato Brasileiro Série C players
Campeonato Brasileiro Série B players
Association football defenders
Brazilian expatriate sportspeople in the Netherlands
Expatriate footballers in the Netherlands
Brazilian expatriate sportspeople in Belgium
Expatriate footballers in Belgium